Czarnów  is a village in the administrative district of Gmina Kamienna Góra, within Kamienna Góra County, Lower Silesian Voivodeship, in south-western Poland.

Czarnów is the location of the oldest Hindu temple in Poland (Nowe Śantipur Temple) and the country's only Shiva temple.

Gallery

References

Villages in Kamienna Góra County